Chas subdivision is an administrative subdivision of the Bokaro district in the North Chotanagpur division in the state of Jharkhand, India.

History
Bokaro district was created on 1 April 1991 by taking out Chas and Chandankiyari CD blocks of Dhanbad district and the entire Bermo subdivision of Giridih district and merging them. Earlier, Dhanbad district was created in 1956 by carving out the old Dhanbad subdivision and Chas and Chandankiyari police station areas of the Sadar subdivision of Manbhum district, on the recommendations of the States Reorganisation Commission.

Administrative set up
Bokaro district has two subdivisions:

Urban frame
Chas is the only statutory town in Chas subdivision. It has 4 census towns:  Bokaro Steel City, Bandhgora, Amlabad and Bhojudih.

Rural frame
There are 248 inhabited villages in Chas subdivision.

Police stations
Police stations in Chas subdivision were at:
Balidih 
Chandankiyari
Chas (M)
Gandhinagar
Harla
Mahila
Maraphari
Penk Narayanpur
SC/ST
Sector IV
Sector VI
Sector XII
Siyaljori

Blocks
Community development blocks in Bermo subdivision are

Economy

Bokaro Steel Plant
Bokaro Steel Plant is one of the largest steel producing units in the country with an annual capacity of 5.8 MT of liquid steel. It was incorporated as a limited company in 1965. It was later merged with the state-owned Steel Authority of India Limited (SAIL).

Vedanta Limited
Electrosteel Steels Limited, whose initial promoters were the Kolkata-based Kejriwal family of the Electrosteel Group, whose flagship is the ductile iron pipe pioneers, Electrosteel Castings, was setting up a 2.51 million tonnes per annum integrated steel plant at Sialjory. The company had acquired 1,723.44 hectares of land for the plant. Vedanta Limited acquired control of Electrosteels Steels Limited in 2018.

Collieries
Amlabad colliery of Eastern Jharia Area of BCCL is a Amlabad.

Bhojudih Coal Washery of BCCL is at Bhojudih.

Education
In 2011, in Chas subdivision out of a total 248 inhabited villages there were 54 villages with pre-primary schools, 233 villages with primary schools, 133 villages with middle schools, 34 villages with secondary schools, 10 villages with senior secondary schools, 1 location with general degree college, 4 locations with non-formal training centres, 2 locations with vocational training institutes, 12 villages with no educational facility.
.*Senior secondary schools are also known as Inter colleges in Jharkhand

Educational institutions
The following institutions are located in Chas subdivision:
Chas College, established in 1976, at Chas.
Guru Gobind Singh Educational Society Technical Campus (GGESTC), established in 2011, at Bokaro Steel City.
CMCE College, established in 1995, at Chira Chas.
Swami Sahjanand College, established in 1984, at Chas.
Chas Mahila College, at Chas.
Ran Vijay Smarak Mahavidyalaya, established in 1982 at Bokaro Steel City.
BB Amina Women's College at Bokaro(?),
Bokaro Steel City College, established in 1970, at Bokaro Steel City.
Immanuel Hai Khan Law College at Bokaro(?).

(Information about degree colleges with proper reference may be added here)

Healthcare
In 2011, in Chas subdivision there were 5 villages with primary health centres, 26 villages with primary health subcentres, 3 villages with maternity and child welfare centres,  6 villages with allopathic hospitals, 9 villages with dispensaries, 2 villages with family welfare centres, 45 villages with medicine shops.
.*Private medical practitioners, alternative medicine etc. not included

Medical facilities
(Anybody having referenced information about location of government/ private medical facilities may please add it here)

References

Sub-divisions in Jharkhand